Lili Zhou  (born December 2, 1989) is a female badminton player from the United States of America.

From 2004 to 2006 she won three times the women's singles at the Boston Badminton Open.
She played at the 2005 World Badminton Championships but lost in the first round to Eriko Hirose of Japan.

Major Achievements
1993 Eleventh Sports Meeting of Guangzhou Singles 1st place
1993 Eleventh Sports Meeting of Guangzhou Doubles .2nd place
1994 Guangxi Jr. Badminton Championships Singles 1st place
1994 China National Contest of Excellent Players
1997 China National Jr. Badminton Championships Doubles 4thplace
1998 China National Badminton Winter Competition “Victory Cup” 1st place
1999 China National Badminton Championships of University 1st
2000 US Classic Doubles 1st place
2001 US Classic Doubles 1st place
2003 Bay Area Open 1st place
2004 Boston Open singles/ Mixed doubles 1st
2004 US Adult National Singles/ doubles 1st place
2004 US Open Singles 2nd place
2005 Honolulu Open Singles/ Doubles 1st place
2005 Boston Open Singles/ Doubles 1st place
2005 UBC Open Singles/Mixed 1st place
2005 YONEX International Championship 2005 1st place
2006 Boston open singles 1st place
2006 GGBC Open Singles 1st place
2007 Won the USA National Team Trials
2007 GGBC Open Singles 1st place
2008 USA Team Trial Singles 1st place
2008 U.S. Open Singles 1st Place

External links

U.S. Open Badminton Championships

American female badminton players
1980 births
Living people
21st-century American women